Gottlieb Garber (January 16, 1859 – December 20, 1932) was an American politician in the state of Washington. He served in the Washington State Senate from 1901 to 1903.

References

1859 births
1932 deaths
Democratic Party Washington (state) state senators
Swiss emigrants to the United States